The 1941 Irish Greyhound Derby took place during September and October with the final being held at Shelbourne Park in Dublin on 4 October.

Foot-and-mouth disease caused serious problems during 1941 with traveling almost ceased and Irish tracks coming to a standstill in many areas. The travel ban was finally lifted at the end of the summer and late plans were drawn up to at least save the Irish Derby before the year ended. This meant a much later final slot in October at Shelbourne Park because Cork had ruled themselves out from being able to stage the race. The winner Brave Damsel was owned by John Byrne who was known for owning the famous bitch Queen of the Suir before she left for the England.

Final result 
At Shelbourne Park, 4 October (over 525 yards):

Distances 
1, ¾ (lengths)

Competition Report
Surly became a leading fancy after round two when beating Heatherset Hero by three lengths in 30.08. The other three second round heats went to Roeside Ilene, Well Protected and Gaelic Inler. Gaelic Inler then provided a 10-1 shock semi-final win over Shes Tidy and Brave Damsel to remain unbeaten. Brilliant Teddy earned victory in the second semi-final from Heatherset Hero and Pretty Forethought. Both hot favourites Surly and Roeside Ilene were eliminated.

In the final Brilliant Teddy trained by Billy Quinn was drawn well in trap six but was forced to pull out. The remaining five runners lined up and Brave Damsel was gambled from 7-1 to 4-1. he won the race leading all the way from the chasing Shes Tidy and Gaelic Inler. Pretty Forethought a finalist form two years previous finished fourth and the favourite Heatherset Hero trailed in last.

See also
 1941 UK & Ireland Greyhound Racing Year

References

Greyhound Derby
Irish Greyhound Derby